Sarna may refer to:

People
Sarna (Polish surname)
Sarna (Punjabi surname)
Sarna (clan), a Punjabi clan of India

Places
Sarna, Warmian-Masurian Voivodeship, a village in northern Poland
Sarna sthal, a place of worship in India
Särna, a locality in Dalarna County, Sweden

Other
SaRNA, small activating RNA
Sarna (drug), a drug
Sarna (religion)

See also
 
Sarnaism, the religious beliefs held by tribes in the state of Jharkhand, India, and other central Indian states
Srna (disambiguation)

Sarna.net ("Sarna" for short) is the fan wiki project for the fictional BattleTech universe, named after the equally fictional star system therein.